IF2: Interceptor Force 2, commonly called Interceptor Force 2, is a 2002 Sci Fi Pictures science-fiction TV movie on the Sci Fi Channel. A sequel to the 1999 Sci Fi Channel telefilm Interceptor Force, it is directed by Phillip Roth, and stars Olivier Gruner, Roger R. Cross, Adrienne Wilkinson, Elizabeth Gracen and  Nigel Bennett. Government-trained soldiers called the Interceptors are assigned to look at a crash site of an alien spacecraft in Russia where they find a  alien that can change shape.

Plot
Over Grozny, Russia, a pair of fighter jets chase down an unidentified spacecraft moving at supersonic speeds. Within minutes, it is the jets that are chased and eventually blasted out of the sky by the spacecraft. Minutes later, residents report a "meteor" flying past the city and landing somewhere in the distant hills. Jack Bavaro, head of the Alpha Force, calls in Lieutenant Sean Lambert, the sole survivor of the first Alpha mission four years ago in Mexico. Lambert's entire team was killed while trying to capture a single specimen of extraterrestrial life. Now Weber wants Lambert to take a new team of interceptors into Russia to capture this new alien specimen.

Lambert and the Alpha Force fly to Grozny. The new team consists of science officer Dawn DeSilva and  German Special Ops soldiers Bjorn Hatch, Nathan McAllister and Adriana Sikes. They find the wreckage of the alien spacecraft outside a Russian nuclear plant. Holes blasted in the razor fencing and thick concrete walls suggest the alien is inside.

The Alpha Force enters the nuclear plant and seal off the exits, creating a trap for the alien. But then, one by one, the team is killed off by a creature that possesses a laser weapon, can change its appearance, and can also regenerate itself completely from a single piece of alien tissue. Additionally, the alien has found a way to explode all the uranium fuel rods in the nuclear plant to create a lethal radiation cloud over Europe that will quickly spread and cover the rest of the world. Lambert and the remaining Alpha Force have 60 minutes to save themselves, and the Earth, from nuclear doom.

Cast
 Olivier Gruner as Lieutenant Sean Lambert
 Roger R. Cross as Nathan McCallister
 Adrienne Wilkinson as Dr. Dawn DeSilvia
 Elizabeth Gracen as Adriana Sikes
 Alex Jolig as Bjorn Hatch
 Eve Scheer as The Woman
 Nigel Bennett as Director Jack Bavaro
 Richard Gnolfo as Jenkins
 Hristo Shopov as Commander Gorshkov
 Vladimir Kolev as First Officer
 Maxim Gentchev as Burly 
 Yulian Vergov as Chechen Rebel Leader
 Georgi Borissov as Dimitrii Pavakori
 Georgi Ivanov as Sergey
 Alan Austin as The President (voice)

Production
The film was produced by the Unified Film Organization and Interforce Productions, LLC, in association with Media Entertainment GmbH, Co. 1 Filmproduktions HG and Sci Fi Pictures. Aside from the crewmembers listed in the infobox, the crew includes production designer Kes Bonnet, digital effects supervisor
David Ridlen, visual effects supervisor Alvaro Villagomez, and costume designer Irene Sinclair.

The original Interceptor Force (1999) had been the Sci Fi Channel's highest-rated TV-movie to that point.

References

External links 
 
 
 

2002 television films
2002 films
2002 science fiction films
American science fiction action films
Films shot in Bulgaria
Syfy original films
Films directed by Phillip J. Roth
2000s American films